The family with sequence similarity 43 member A (FAM43A) gene, also known as; GCO3P195887, GC03P194406, GC03P191784, and NM_153690.3, codes for a 423 bp protein that is conserved in primates, and orthologs have been found in vertebrate and invertebrate species.  Three transcripts have been identified, two protein coding isoforms (aAug10, bAug10), and a non-coding transcript (cAug10). Molecular weight of 45.8 kdal in the unphosphorylated state and isoelectric point of 6.1.

Gene
Located on the long arm of Chromosome 3 at 3q29, FAM43A consists of 2,493 bases; and the translated protein contains a phosphotyrosine interaction domain, putative phosphoinositide binding site and putative peptide binding sites.

Introduction
The FAM43A gene has been identified in cDNA screening as a possible cancer development and progression candidate gene. Unpublished data from Zhang et al. indicates that FAM43A could possess tumor suppressor function however the direct interaction is unknown.  As well as playing a role in cancer development, FAM43A has been identified as a possible autism spectrum disorder (ASD) candidate gene, with mutations within the upstream single nucleotide polymorphism (SNP) rs789859 correlating with the presentation of ASD and learning disorder; suggesting that this SNP is the promoter region for the downstream FAM43A gene.  The 2014 study completed by Baron-Cohen et al. involved the screening of 906 K SNPs within the genome to identify possible candidate genes, with FAM43A being the closest gene to the polymorphism.

Protein
FAM43A and paralog FAM43B comprise a specific gene family, and share structural homology with the low-density lipoprotein receptor adaptor protein (LDLrP).  Orthologs were identified in Mammalia, Aves, Actinopterygii, Reptilia, Hemichordata, Cephalochardata, Mollusca, Brachiopoda, Nematoda, and Arthropoda.  No orthologs were identified beyond invertebrate species.

Paralogs
FAM43A and paralog FAM43B comprise a specific gene family who share structural homology with the low-density lipoprotein receptor adaptor protein (LDLrP).

Orthologs

A distant homolog was identified using NCBI protein BLAST, low density lipoprotein receptor adaptor protein 1-like in [Cryptotermes secundus].  However, when the sequence LOC111863195 was compared to Homo sapiens, it was discovered that the homolog mapped to chromosome 1, making it an ortholog of the paralog FAM43B.  The fact that FAM43A protein cannot be traced back any further in evolutionary history than invertebrates indicates that this could be the point that FAM43A and paralog FAM43B diverged, approximately 797 million years ago (MYA).

Expression

Tissue specific expression
FAM43A protein is highly expressed in the mouth, vascular system, spleen and ear.  Significant expression noted in the adipose tissue, umbilical cord, and bone, with highest expression in the infant developmental stage.

Disease state expression
Expression is upregulated in head and neck tumor and bladder carcinoma, suggesting an oncogenic function.  FAM43A expression is upregulated in Early T-cell precursor (ETP) acute lymphoblastic leukemia (ALL) (GDS4299) and triple negative breast cancer (TNBC) cell lines Hs578T (GDS4092).  FAM43A expression map of Mus musculus  brain indicated differential expression in the cortex, corpus callosum, and hypothalamus.  The primary function of the corpus callosum is to innervate and connect the two hemispheres of the brain.  The corpus callosum integrates motor, sensory, and cognitive performance between the cortical region in one hemisphere with its target in the other hemisphere.  The hypothalamus links the nervous system to the endocrine system through the pituitary gland.

Variation

3q29 microdeletion syndrome (monosomy 3q29) is caused by interstitial deletions of 3q29, mediated by nonallelic homologous recombination between low-copy repeats resulting in a common deletion.  3q29 microdeletion syndrome is marked by the loss of 1.6 million base pairs, including 5 known genes and 17 unknown transcripts.  Genes phosphate and cytidyltransferase 1, choline alpha (PYT1A), P21 (RAC1) activated kinase 2 (PAK2), melanotransferrin (MFI2), discs large MAGUK scaffold protein 1 (DLG1), and 3-hydroxybutyrate dehydrogenase 1 (BDH1) have been confirmed and another 7 genes have been implicated with incomplete cDNAs, and the remaining hypothetical genes are yet to be confirmed experimentally.  Presentation of 3q29 microdeletion syndrome has shown increased risk for schizophrenia.  Gene neighbors PAK2 and DLG1 have been implicated due to interaction with neuroligin and the AMPA receptor subunit GluR1.  In 2015, Guida et al. identified a novel mutation proximal to the 3q29 microdeletion region that correlated with presentation of oculo auriculo vertebral spectrum (OAVS).  Research of Robertson et al. revealed the presence of FAM43A mRNA in the fetal cochlea and association with development of normal hearing function.  These findings indicate that variation in FAM43A could be responsible for the development of OAVS.

Promoter
Transcription factor binding can be seen below within the FAM43A promoter region, searches were completed on the 500 bp preceding the start codon.

3' untranslated region
MicroRNA binding sites were identified and then compared to species conservation of FAM43A to determine likely 3' untranslated region (UTR) stem loop structures as depicted to the right.

Post-translational Modification

FAM43 is predicted to be a nuclear protein, to identify function, structure and function for LDL receptor adaptor protein (LDLrP) was completed.  Conserved residues Y52 and S93 are highlighted in the structure of LDLrP to the right.  Three phosphorylation sites were identified with conservation between human and mouse genotypes at T112-p, S114-p, and T-379-p.  The translated protein contains a primary and secondary nuclear localization signal and has a predicted GPI-linkage site at D407, and a Caspase 3 and 7 cleavage site from amino acids 404-408 indicating possible translocation from the cell membrane to the nucleus.

Interacting Proteins

Direct interaction with SRPK2 (SRSF Protein Kinase 2), Serine/arginine-rich protein-specific kinase, which phosphorylates substrates at serine residues rich in Arginine/Serine dipeptides (RS domains), involved in the phosphorylation of SR splicing factors and the regulation of splicing.  SRSF protein kinase 2 promotes neural apoptosis by up-regulating cyclin-D1 expression through the suppression of p53/TP53 phosphorylation.  Protein phosphatase 2A is one of the four major Ser/Thr phosphatases which regulate negative control of cell growth and division.  FAM43A shows predicted interaction with the Abelson (ABL) kinase, and ABL members link diverse extracellular stimuli to signaling pathways controlling cell growth, survival, invasion, adhesion, and migration.

References